The sack of Padua was carried out by Attila and his Huns and Germanic allies. It was part of the wars fought by Attila in Italy in 452 AD, during his invasion of the peninsula. It followed the Sack of Aquileia and preceded the Siege of Milan.

Background
Aetius, who had grown up among the Huns, was hoping to cooperate with them against the Visigoths. He therefore left the mountain passes unguarded, but Attila, seeking the hand of Honoria, and part of the Western Empire as dowry, crossed them into northern Italy. In 452 the Huns entered the plains around Padua, and sacked Aquileia, an important Roman city which had historically been subject to sieges on account of its position on the "gates" of Italy.

Siege
After sacking Aquileia in 452, they proceeded through the Paduan plains to Padua, in present-day Veneto. They attacked the city in the same year. Padua was sacked and suffered severely from this attack. Following the fall of Padua, the Huns conquered in swift succession Mantua, Vicentia, Verona, Brescia and Bergamo before reaching the former Western Roman capital Mediolanum, which they also besieged and captured. 

Legend has it that the Roman survivors of the sieges of Aquileia, Verona, and Padua fled to the Venetian islands, where they founded Venice.

References

450s conflicts
452
Padua
Battles involving the Huns
Battles in Veneto 
5th century in Italy
Padua
Attila the Hun
Looting